The Chongqing Science and Technology Museum is a science museum in the Jiangbei District of Chongqing, China.

The ground-breaking ceremony for the museum was held on 7 January 2006 and construction started in October 2006. The museum was opened to the public on 9 September 2009. Guida Moseley Brown Architects were involved in the project. The museum cost 567 million RMB to build. It is on a plot of 37 mu and the building has a floor area of 45,300 m2.

The museum is centrally located in Jiangbeizui CBD, near the Chongqing Grand Theatre and the confluence of the Jialing River and the Yangtze River.
It has an IMAX theatre.
The museum is free for school children.

See also
 List of museums in China
 Three Gorges Museum

References

External links

 Museum website 

Jiangbei District, Chongqing
2009 establishments in China
Museums established in 2009
Museums in Chongqing
Science museums in China
Technology museums in China
IMAX venues